"Allahu Akbar" is a pro-military patriotic song composed by Egyptian songwriter Abdalla Shams El-Din in 1954 and written by the Egyptian poet Mahmoud El-Sherif in 1955 in Egypt. It was first used as an Egyptian military marching song during the Suez Crisis in 1956. From 2 March 1977 to 20 October 2011, the song was adopted as the national anthem of Libya under Muammar Gaddafi.

History

Egyptian origins
"Allahu Akbar" was originally an Egyptian military marching song which became popular in Egypt and Syria during the Suez Crisis. The lyrics were written by Mahmoud El-Sherif, and the music was composed by Abdalla Shams El-Din. The song continues to be popular among the Arab world.

Use in Libya
"Allahu Akbar" was adopted as the official national anthem of the Libyan Arab Republic on 1 September 1969, by Libyan leader Muammar Gaddafi, showing his hopes of uniting the Arab world. "Allahu Akbar" replaced the previous national anthem "Libya, Libya, Libya", which had been used by the Kingdom of Libya since its independence in 1951.

When the Libyan Arab Republic became the Socialist People's Libyan Arab Jamahiriya on 2 March 1977, "Allahu Akbar" remained the national anthem of Libya. However, when Libya and Egypt broke off diplomatic relations following the latter's peace treaty with the State of Israel in 1979, the Egyptian origins of the national anthem were no longer mentioned by official government sources.

When the Libyan Arab Jamahiriya was dissolved on 20 October 2011, following the Libyan Civil War and the death of Muammar Gaddafi, "Libya, Libya, Libya" was once again adopted as the new national anthem of Libya, by the National Transitional Council. Gaddafi loyalists continued to use the anthem.

Lyrics

See also

 Takbir
 Suez Crisis
 Libyan Civil War
 Muammar Gaddafi
 Libya, Libya, Libya

References

External links

 

Historical national anthems
Egyptian songs 
Egyptian music
Egyptian patriotic songs 
Songs about the military
Songs about soldiers
National symbols of Libya
African anthems
Pan-Arabist media